Solveig Rafnsdóttir (1470–1561 or 1563), was the last abbess of the Reynistaðarklaustur, an Abbey of the Order of Saint Benedict on Iceland.

Life
Solveig Rafnsdóttir was the daughter of the elderman of Iceland, Hrafn Brandsson, and Margrét Eyjólfsdóttir and the sister of the priest ocBrand Hrafnsson. She became a member of the Order of Saint Benedict in the abbey of Reynistaðarklaustur, one of only two convents on Iceland open to women, in 1493, and became its abbess in 1508. She was the manager of significant lands on Iceland through her position. 

During the Protestant Reformation, the estates of the convent was confiscated and the convent was closed and banned from accepting any new novices. Solveig Rafnsdóttir lost her authority, but she and the other nuns were allowed to remain in the former convent for life. She died in 1561 or 1563.

See also
 Halldóra Sigvaldadóttir

References 
„„Reynistaðarklaustur“. Tímarit Hins íslenska bókmenntafélags, 8. árg. 1887.“,
„„Reynistaðarklaustur“. Sunnudagsblað Tímans, 6. ágúst 1967.“,
Sigríður Gunnarsdóttir: Nunnuklaustrið að Reynistað. Smárit Byggðasafns Skagfirðinga.

15th-century Icelandic women
16th-century Icelandic women
1470 births
1563 deaths
Benedictine abbesses